Emil Alexander de Schweinitz (January 18, 1866 – February 15, 1904) was an American bacteriologist.

Biography
He was born in Salem, North Carolina, and was the son of Moravian Bishop Emil de Schweinitz. He attended Nazareth Area High School in Nazareth, Pennsylvania and Moravian College in Bethlehem, Pennsylvania, and received a Ph.D. from the University of North Carolina in 1882 and another from Göttingen in 1886.

On returning to the United States he taught chemistry in Tufts College, Massachusetts, and then became a professor of chemistry at the Agricultural and Mechanical College of Kentucky. After becoming associated with the chemical division of the Agricultural Department, Washington, D.C. in 1888, he was appointed as director of the biochemical laboratory of the department's Bureau of Animal Industry  in 1890, a position he remained in until his death. He was a member of the American Public Health Association from 1896. He was also chair of chemistry and toxicology in the Columbian University and later its dean.

He specialized in bacteria and immunity, and studied the bacterial products of tuberculosis, hog cholera and glanders. Among other essays, he published Laboratory Guide (1898).

He lived at 1023 Vermont Avenue, in Washington, D.C. and was a member of the Chevy, Cosmos, and Metropolitan Clubs. He died suddenly of uremia in 1904 at age 38.

Works
A Chemical Study of the Osage Orange as a Substitute for the Mulberry in rearing Silkworms (1889)
The Poisons produced by the Hog Cholera Germ (1890)
The Production of Immunity to Swine Plague by Use of the Products of the Germ (1891)
The Use of Mallein and its Active Principles (1892)
A Preliminary Study of the Poisons of the Tuberculosis Bacillus and the Practical Value and Use of Tuberculin (1892)
Artificial Media for Bacterial Cultures (1893)
The Effect of Tuberculin on the Milk of Cows (1894)
The Chemical Composition of the Tuberculosis and Glanders Bacilli (1895)
A Hygienic Study of Oleomargarine (1896)
The War with the Microbes (1897)

Notes

References
 
 

American science writers
American bacteriologists
United States Department of Agriculture officials
Nazareth Area High School alumni
George Washington University faculty
University of Kentucky faculty
Tufts University faculty
University of North Carolina at Chapel Hill alumni
Moravian University alumni
1866 births
1904 deaths
Bureau of Animal Industry
People from Salem, North Carolina